Welbourne is a surname. Notable people with the surname include:

Don Welbourne (born 1949), English footballer
Duncan Welbourne (born 1940), English footballer and manager
Edward Welbourne (1894–1966), Master of Emmanuel College, Cambridge
Thomas Welbourne (died 1605), English martyr

See also
Welbourn (disambiguation)